CCNY most commonly refers to the City College of New York.

CCNY may also refer to:

Carnegie Corporation of New York
Criminal Court of New York
CCNY (gene)